Kelly Sullivan (born April 30, 1964) is an American painter known for her collaborative paintings called "FingerSmears".  Sullivan combines finger smears and signatures of hundreds of people on one canvas to commemorate events around the country. 

Sullivan estimates over 100,000 people across the United States have made FingerSmears, including The Rolling Stones, Bruce Springsteen and many others who have contributed to Sullivan's work. Sullivan's work with FingerSmears has raised over $150,000 for charities. Her FingerSmear entitled "The Hands for Hope" was auctioned off to benefit the September 11th Fund.  

Sullivan has developed two spin-off projects from her FingerSmears called Mighty Fingers Facing Change (MFFC) and Paint.Team.  MFFC is a two-part experiential art project designed to engage and inspire girls around the world through a guided self-portrait that expresses their individual goals and changes they would like to see in the world, as well as allowing them to participate in a collaborative FingerSmear called "Abundance". Sullivan has taken MFFC to Guatemala, Uganda, Haiti, India, China, as well as various parts of the US.  Paint.Team was launched as a web-based tool, a "digital FingerSmear" app, that allows thousands to participate in one piece of art from anywhere in the world using their own computers or smartphones. Sullivan enlisted a team of software and web designers to make this app available.

Sullivan was born in New Brunswick, New Jersey, she was taught to paint at an early age by her maternal grandmother, Alice Foster. Her studio was in Driggs, Idaho, but currently is in Lambertville, NJ.

References

External links

1964 births
Living people
Artists from New Brunswick, New Jersey
American women painters
People from Driggs, Idaho
21st-century American women artists